Charles Beresford Fulke Greville, 3rd Baron Greville  (3 March 1871 – 14 May 1952) was a British soldier and aristocrat.

Early life
He was the second son of four children born to the writer Lady Beatrice Violet Graham and the politician Algernon Greville, 2nd Baron Greville, who married in 1863. His older brother, Ronald Greville, died in 1908. His younger sisters were Hon. Camilla Dagmar Violet Greville (wife of Hon. Alistair George Hay, son of the Earl of Kinnoull) and Hon. Lilian Veronique Greville (wife of Cmdr. Herbert Victor Creer).  His father was a Liberal MP for Westmeath who was appointed a Groom in Waiting to Queen Victoria in 1869 and, from 1873 to 1874, served as a Lord of the Treasury in Gladstone's government.

His paternal grandparents were Fulke Greville-Nugent, 1st Baron Greville and his wife, Lady Rosa Nugent (the only daughter and heir of the George Nugent, 1st Marquess of Westmeath).  His maternal grandparents were James Graham, 4th Duke of Montrose and the former Hon. Caroline Agnes Horsley-Beresford (third daughter of John Horsley-Beresford, 2nd Baron Decies).

Career
From 1893 to 1895, Greville served as Aide-de-camp to the Earl Cadogan, the Lord Lieutenant of Ireland, followed by Aide-de-camp to Lord Northcote, the Governor of Bombay from 1900 to 1904. From 1904 to 1908, he served as Military Secretary to the Governor-General of Australia.

Charles Greville worked for the British military from 1897, serving in the Second Matabele War. Then between 1899 to 1905, he was a Captain with the 7th Queen's Own Hussars. From 1914 to 1918 during World War I, he was a Major with the Lovat Scouts. From 1914 to 1943, he was chairman of St George's Hospital. In 1919, he was made an Officer of the Most Excellent Order of the British Empire.

As his older brother, Ronald, died without issue in 1908, Charles succeeded to his father's barony upon his death in 1909.  The Greville estate aggregated to 20,000 acres across England.

Personal life
In February 1909, his mother, Lady Violet (who died in 1932), wrote about the decadence of British society, blaming American brides. "'This,' she writes, 'has struck at the root of our family life and introduced a new element into the simplicity and dignity of old-fashioned households.  The rich American has no traditions; no prejudices in favour of old customs, duties, or responsibilities; she is essentially irresponsible, and measures everything by one standard only--money. The result permeating through all classes has considerably increased luxury and made for independence. It has, far more than any suffragette movement, given liberty to women to do as they like; for the American regards her husband as an inferior being, made to work for her, and to lavish pleasures and gifts as a reward for her beauty and sprightliness.'"  At the time, it was thought to be a criticism of the marriage of Lord Granard to Beatrice Mills.

Nine months later on 24 November 1909, Charles was married to American heiress Olive (née Grace) Kerr (1876–1959, niece of American millionaires Michael P. Grace and William R. Grace), at St Paul's Church, Knightsbridge.  Olive was more than twenty minutes late to the wedding due to the breakdown of her car on the way to the ceremony.  The wedding was in London, followed by a large reception at the Carlton House Terrace home of Freddie Guest and his American wife, Amy Phipps (a daughter of Henry Phipps Jr.), which the Greville's had rented for a year. The guests at the wedding included Prince Alexander of Teck. Olive, the widow of banker Henry S. Kerr (from whom she inherited $1,000,000), was a daughter of John W. Grace of Leybourne Grange in Kent (formerly the seat of the Hawley baronets) and a niece of Michael P. Grace and Mayor William Russell Grace, founder of W. R. Grace and Company. Together, Olive and Charles were the parents of:

Ronald Charles Fulke Greville, 4th Baron Greville (1912–1987), who died unmarried.

Lord Greville died on 14 May 1952 and was succeeded in the barony by his eldest legitimate son, Ronald. Upon Ronald's death in 1987, the barony of Greville became extinct, although his second son Peter Charles Algernon Ascroft Greville may come to inherit the Title.

Lord Greville, 3rd Baron Greville, Charles Beresford Fulke Greville had two sons. The second son was the Greville family secret and never recognised although known by the senior family members, was Peter Charles Algernon Ascroft Greville, he was born June 27th 1916 at his cousin Earl Harcourt's estate Ankerwycke Priory, where he remained until the age of four. The mother Cecil Violet Enid Ascroft (formerly Greville) was separated in 1913 from her first husband Charles Walmer Harcourt Ascroft and returned from Africa to England in 1913 with her father Major Brooke Southwell Greville. She was the 3rd Baron Greville's niece and the daughter of Major Brooke Southwell Greville, Kings Messenger. Cecil Violet Enid (Greville) Ascroft returned back to London in 1913 and worked at the War Office and the Greville families closely socialised together with Baron Greville and Cecil Violet Enid Greville becoming intimate and she conceived her uncle Baron Greville's child. The Greville family moved her out of London very quickly in 1915 to give birth to her son Peter Charles Algernon Greville Ascroft. Her son was put into a private boys' school aged just four and she returned back to the Greville's residence at Beaufort Gardens, Knightsbridge in 1920. Cecil Violet Enid then obtained a divorce from her first husband in 1927 and married Air Commodore Edward Irvine Bussell CBE in 1927. Her first son and second son of Baron Greville, Peter Charles Algernon Ascroft Greville died in 2007 and his eldest son Christopher Brooke Fulke Greville after being told the family secret and obtaining DNA will claim the Barony.

Notes

References

Sources

External links
Charles Beresford Fulke Greville, 3rd Baron Greville (1871-1952), National Trust Collections
Olive Grace, Lady Greville (d.1959), photograph taken by Alice Hughes, National Trust Collections
 

1871 births
1952 deaths
Barons in the Peerage of the United Kingdom
Charles
Officers of the Order of the British Empire
Younger sons of barons